Jack Lewis (born January 20, 1964) is an American author and military veteran.

Lewis was born in Portland, Oregon, and was a United States Army Staff Sergeant in the Iraq War in 2004 and 2005.

Lewis' writing was included in the book Operation Homecoming, and in the Oscar-nominated documentary Operation Homecoming: Writing the Wartime Experience in which he both appears, and is credited as a writer.

He has been a contributor to a number of publications including Crosscut.com, the Seattle Post-Intelligencer and Motorcyclist magazine where he writes the "Behind Bars" column.

Bibliography

Writing awards
 Midwest Book Review Reviewer's Choice (small press), Nothing in Reserve, January 2012
 Washington Post Best Nonfiction of 2006 (current events), Operation Homecoming

References

External links

 
 

1964 births
Living people
United States Army personnel of the Iraq War
Writers from Portland, Oregon
Washington State University alumni
University of Southern California alumni
Motorcycling writers
Motorcycle journalists
United States Army reservists
United States Army soldiers